Vinkovci railway station is the railway station located in Vinkovci, on the Novska–Tovarnik railway. The railway continues to Ivankovo to the west, to Jankovci to the east, to Otok to the southeast, to Andrijaševci to the southwest, to Osijek to the northwest, and to Vukovar–Borovo Naselje to the northeast. Vinkovci railway station consists of 15 railway tracks.

See also 
 Croatian Railways
 Zagreb–Belgrade railway

References 

Railway stations in Croatia